The 2021 Sydney SuperNight (known for sponsorship reasons as the 2021 Bunnings Trade Sydney SuperNight) is a motor racing event held on the weekend of 29-31 October 2021 at Sydney Motorsport Park in Eastern Creek, New South Wales.

Entry List

Results

Practice

Qualifying

Q1

Top 10

Races

Race 1

Race 2

Race 3

Notes

References 

Supercars Championship races
Motorsport in Sydney
2021 in Supercars